Les mousquetaires de la reine is a comic opera by Fromental Halévy premiered at the Opéra-Comique 3 February 1846.

Recordings
Act III: Couplets. "Enfin un jour plus doux se lève" (Olivier) Cyrille Dubois, Orchestre National de Lille and Pierre Dumoussaud, Alpha 2023

References

Operas by Fromental Halévy
1846 operas
Opéras comiques
Operas
French-language operas
Operas set in France